Lords of the Earth (LOTE) is a play-by-email game, first published by Thomas Harlan in 1983 during a growing era of PBM games. Initially played by postal mail, the game featured  mixed moderation—computer moderated with some human assistance. By 2002, the publisher processed turns by email (PBeM). Lords of the Earth comprises multiple campaigns, each one a separate game. Campaign 1 is the oldest, set in the mid-1800s in the "Age of Air and Steam". Other campaigns begin from 2000 BCE to 1400 CE. Settings were global in scale, with one campaign featuring an outer space setting.

Campaigns are open-ended, with no set victory conditions. A game lasts about 25 years. Fifty or more players compete as leaders of various types of nations. Map features include varied terrain, religions, wealth, and ability to resist others using diplomacy or warfare. A reviewer in the early 2000s noted positives and negatives about the game, observing that some players went to great lengths to win, even "using false identities or smear campaigns".

Play-by-mail genre

Play-by-mail (PBM) games feature a number of differences from tabletop games. The typical PBM game involves many more players than an average tabletop game can support. PBM game lengths are usually longer, depending on a number of factors. Turnaround time is how long a player has to prepare and submit "orders" (moves and changes to make in the game) and the company has to process them and send back turn results. The average turnaround time in the 1980s was two weeks, but some modern PBM games are play-by-email (PBEM) with shorter turnaround times of twice per week or faster. Open ended games allow players to strengthen their positions without end, with players continually entering and leaving the game. Examples include Heroic Fantasy and Monster Island. Conversely, closed end games typically have all players starting on equal terms, with rapid, intense, player vs. player gameplay that ends when a player or group achieves some victory condition or is unopposed. Examples include Hyborian War and It's a Crime. The complexity of PBM games can range from the relatively simple to the PBM game Empyrean Challenge, once described as "the most complex game system on Earth".

Once a player has chosen a game and receives an initial game setup, gameplay begins. This generally involves players filling out order sheets for a game (see example image) and sending them to the gaming company. The company processes the turns and returns the results to the player, who completes a subsequent order sheet. Diplomacy is also frequently an important—sometimes indispensable—part of gameplay. The initial choice of a PBM game requires consideration as there is a wide array of possible roles to play, from pirates to space characters to "previously unknown creatures". Close identification with a role typically increases a player's game satisfaction.

History
The earliest play-by-mail games developed as a way for geographically separated gamers to compete with each other using postal mail. Chess and Go are among the oldest examples of this. In these two-player games, players sent moves directly to each other. Multi-player games emerged later: Diplomacy is an early example of this type, emerging in 1963, in which a central game master manages the game, receiving moves and publishing adjudications. According to Shannon Appelcline, there was some PBM play in the 1960s, but not much. For example, some wargamers began playing Stalingrad by mail in this period.  

In the early 1970s, in the United States, Rick Loomis, of Flying Buffalo Inc., began a number of multi-player play-by-mail games; these included games such as Nuclear Destruction, which launched in 1970. This began the professional PBM industry in the United States. Professional game moderation started in 1971 at Flying Buffalo which later added games such as Battleplan, Starweb, and others, which by the late 1980s were all computer moderated. 

For approximately five years, Flying Buffalo was the single dominant company in the US PBM industry until Schubel & Son entered the field in roughly 1976 with the human-moderated Tribes of Crane. Schubel & Son introduced fee structure innovations which allowed players to pay for additional options or special actions outside of the rules. For players with larger bankrolls, this provided advantages and the ability to game the system. The next big entrant was Superior Simulations with its game Empyrean Challenge in 1978. Reviewer Jim Townsend asserted that it was "the most complex game system on Earth" with some large position turn results 1,000 pages in length. 

In the early 1980s, the field of PBM players was growing. Individual PBM game moderators were plentiful in 1980. However, the PBM industry in 1980 was still nascent: there were still only two sizable commercial PBM companies, and only a few small ones. The most popular games of 1980 were Starweb and Tribes of Crane. It was in this environment that Thomas Harlan launched Lords of the Earth.

Development
The 1st Lords of the Earth Campaign started in 1983. It focused on nation development versus expansion by conquest. Thomas Harlan designed the original rules. In 1995, the game was run by postal mail and had mixed-moderation—hand moderated with computer assistance. In 2002 there were more than twenty active campaigns run by multiple gamemasters globally. By 2002, the game was play-by-email (PBeM). It supplemented the base rules with a Renaissance and Industrial addition. A subsequent Modern Age rulebook combined all rules editions for the campaign. Gamemasters for subsequent campaigns could adjust Harlan's original rule set. Leslie Dodd added a diplomacy addendum to Game 42.

Campaign 1 was the oldest of many Lords of the Earth universes. In 2002, Martin Helsdon asserted that Campaign 1 (LOTE01) might have been the "longest continuously running PBM" game after more than twenty years of play. The 1st Campaign included players from across North America, as well as Australia, France, and the United Kingdom.

Gameplay
Each player represents a nation, with more than fifty players competing in certain campaigns. Various nation types are available, depending on the campaign, such as barbarian or seafaring, secret nations, religious groups, and merchant consortia. Map regions have varied terrain, religions, wealth and the ability to resist others using diplomacy or warfare. Game turn periods begin at five years each and decrease as the game continues. The game is open-ended, with no set victory conditions. One game takes about 25 years. 

According to Warren Bruhn, campaigns have started in periods from 2000 BCE to 1400 CE. The 1st Campaign was set in the mid-1800s, in the "Age of Air and Steam" which was global in scale. The game setting comprised 24 Geographic Zones. Although the global scale became typical, game settings have included outer space as well. As campaigns progress, nations' technology levels increase. By 2002, 1st Campaign gameplay had progressed from the year 1000 to 1752 CE. Global calamities were much more frequent in Campaign 1 relative to other campaigns.

Gameplay spans combat, economics, intrigue, and social and cultural topics. Combat ability progresses with tech levels around Cavalry, Infantry, Warship, and Siege capabilities. In the game, players can "found universities, build cities, create trade routes, massacre populations, enforce religious conversions, engage in both overt and covert warfare, forge alliances, break treaties, and sometimes suffer the dread dynastic failure, when their nation implodes". Conducting diplomacy and developing public works contributes to success, with the latter returning outsized dividends for new players. Player interaction is significant, occurring by phone, email, and online discussions.

Reception
Martin Helsdon reviewed the game in various issues of Flagship magazine in 2002–2003. He noted drawbacks such as lengthy rules and "GM burnout". He recommended the game, stating that "it is an intriguing and frustrating game with a depth and breadth not equalled by any other I have encountered". He noted that some players took gameplay overly serious, even "using false identities or smear campaigns". Andrew Barton reviewed the game in a 2000 issue of Flagship, noting positives and negatives about the rules. He stated that "Lords of the Earth allows you to ... role-play whole nations. I don't know of another PBM game quite like it".

See also
 List of play-by-mail games

Notes

References

Bibliography

 
 
 
 
 
 
 
 
 
 
 
 
 
 
 
 
 
 
 
 
 
 
 
 
 
 
 
 
 
 
 
 
 
 
 

Play-by-mail games